Beddau Rugby Football Club is a rugby union team from the village of Beddau, South Wales. The present club was formed in 1951-52, but it can trace its roots to around 1900. Beddau RFC is a member of the Welsh Rugby Union and is a feeder club for Cardiff Blues.

History
Beddau had a village rugby team from around 1900 until the Second World War. During the war all the club's records were destroyed apart from a few remaining photographs of Beddau RFC teams from the late 1930s.

Beddau RFC was reformed in 1951-52 and has since been based in Castellau Road, Beddau. The club plays at Mount Pleasant Park, Beddau.

Today
Today, Beddau RFC plays in the WRU Championship. In the 2006-07 season, Beddau RFC won the Division One East League, but were denied promotion to the Premier League as their grounds were deemed not to meet WRU criteria. This ruling was upheld at an EGM by 67% of members.
The Club was entered into the inaugural Swalec Championship and had several good seasons in the second WRU league tier before being relegated in 2013/14. In 2014/15 With new coaches Lee Davies and Ben Daniels at the helm the Green and Golds led by Glenn Slater bounced back immediately to the Championship winning the Division One East Central title in emphatic fashion, winning 21 out of their 22 fixtures and going unbeaten at home. Winning the league meant a Play-off game for promotion to the Championship against Penalta RFC which beddau won convincingly 22-13.

The Club has a thriving mini and junior section, excellent Youth team that all feeds into the Development XV and 1st XV.

Club honours
 Worthington's Mid District Cup 2007-08 - Winners
 Swalec Division One East Champions 2014/15
 WRU Division One East Champions - 2006-07
 Mid District Cup 2006-07 - Winners
 Mid District Cup 2005-06 - Winners
 Mid District Cup 2004-05 - Winners
 Mid District Cup 2003-04 - Winners
 Glamorgan County Silver Ball Trophy 1989-90 - Winners
 Mid District Cup 1970-71 - Winners

Notable former players

Full Internationals
 Gareth Prothero (Wales and British Lions)
 Steve Fenwick (Wales and British Lions)
 Chris Bridges (Wales)
 Andrew Lamerton (Wales)
 Gareth Wyatt (Wales)
 Michael Owen (Wales and British Lions)
 Gemma Hallett (Wales Women)
 Gethin Jenkins (Wales and British Lions)
 Bradley Davies (Wales)

Current Internationals
Tom Slater (Wales Sevens)
 Tom Riley (Wales Sevens)

External links
 Beddau Rugby Football Club

References

Welsh rugby union teams